"Laiki Geitonia"() is a traditional neighbourhood is the pedestrian area of walled city of Nicosia, Cyprus, opposite to the D'Avila bastion and 0.3 km long from the Eleftheria square.
Laiki Geitonia's restoration of houses is an example of traditional Cypriot urban architecture. The buildings date from the end of the 18th Century, with building materials being mainly wood, sandstone and mudbrick. It is a pedestrianised area of narrow winding streets, combining residential houses with craft shops, souvenir shops and tavernas.

The main Tourist Information Centre in Nicosia is located in Laiki Geitonia and a number of walking tours of Nicosia start on Mondays, Thursdays, and Fridays from that place.

Gallery

See also 
Rigenis Street
Ledra Street
Onasagorou Street
Eleftheria Square

References

External links 

 

Geography of Cyprus
Nicosia
Tourism in Cyprus